Chase is an unincorporated community in Franklin Parish, Louisiana, United States. Its ZIP code is 71324.

Notes

Unincorporated communities in Franklin Parish, Louisiana
Unincorporated communities in Louisiana